Subtriquetridae is a family of crustaceans belonging to the order Porocephalida.

Genera:
 Subtriquetra Sambon, 1922

References

Crustaceans
Taxa described in 1961